A Mars jar or Mars simulation chamber is a container that simulates the atmosphere of the planet Mars. It is used in astrobiology experiments to determine what kind of life on Mars might be viable.

Features 
Mars jars have evolved from simple glass containers that resembled kitchen jars in the 1950s to sophisticated temperature-controlled pressure vessels that are now more commonly called "Mars environmental simulation chamber" or "Mars atmosphere simulation chamber". In such devices, a variety of aspects of the Martian environment can be replicated, such as atmospheric composition and pressure, surface materials, temperature cycles and solar radiation.

History 

The concept and the name "Mars jar" originate with Hubertus Strughold, a German physiologist and pioneering space medicine researcher. Strughold described Mars jars in his 1953 publication The Green and Red Planet: A Physiological Study of the Possibility of Life on Mars, in which he also coined the term "astrobiology". By 1956, Mars jars were part of U.S. Air Force research projects into crewed Mars missions.

The concept was popularized outside military circles in 1957 by the biologist Joshua Lederberg, who proposed it to NASA leaders, and then by the astrophysicist and science educator Carl Sagan, who featured Mars jars in his TV shows. According to the science historian Jordan Bimm, Strughold's work was not mentioned in later descriptions of Mars jars because civilian scientists wanted to avoid association with the military and with Strughold's involvement in human experimentation in Nazi Germany.

References 

Astrobiology
Atmosphere of Mars